Farmers State Bank or Farmers State Bank Building may refer to:

in the United States (by state)

Farmers State Bank (Conway, Arkansas), listed on the National Register of Historic Places (NRHP)
Farmers State Bank of Cope, Cope, Colorado, NRHP-listed in Washington County
Farmers State Bank Building (Fort Morgan, Colorado), listed on the NRHP in Colorado
Farmers' State Bank (Volga, Iowa), listed on the NRHP in Iowa
Farmers State Bank (Lindsborg, Kansas), listed on the NRHP in Kansas
Farmers State Bank (Valparaiso, Indiana), a part of the NRHP-listed Valparaiso Downtown Commercial District
Farmers State Bank of Chesterfield, listed on the NRHP in Missouri
Farmers State Bank (Adams, Nebraska), listed on the NRHP in Nebraska
Farmers State Bank (Loomis, Nebraska), listed on the NRHP in Nebraska
Farmers State Bank of Platte, listed on the NRHP in South Dakota
Farmers State Bank (Georgetown, Texas)

See also
Farmers and Mechanics Savings Bank (disambiguation)
Farmers and Merchants Bank (disambiguation)